David John Rock (born 20 April 1957) is a former English cricketer. Rock was a right-handed batsman and a right-arm medium pace bowler.

Rock made his first-class debut for Hampshire in the 1970 County Championship against Surrey. Rock played in three County Championship matches during that season.

In 1977 Rock became a more regular appearer for Hampshire, making his List-A debut against Somerset. Rock made two List-A half centuries during 1977, making his maiden fifty against Middlesex, and his second and final List-A fifty against Gloucestershire. In the County Championship, Rock had his best season, making his maiden century against Leicestershire and following it up with another against Nottinghamshire.

Rock continued to appear for the county in 1978 and 1979, before playing his final first-class match against Kent in the County Championship and his final List-A match against Warwickshire in the John Player League.

In 37 first-class matches for Hampshire Rock scored 1,227 runs at an average of 19.17, with three centuries and four half centuries, with a high score of 114. Rock played eighteen one-day matches for Hampshire, scoring 286 runs at an average of 19.06, with two half centuries and a high score of 68.

See also
English cricketers
Cricket in England

External links
David Rock at Cricinfo
David Rock at CricketArchive
Matches and detailed statistics for David Rock

1957 births
Living people
People from Southsea
English cricketers
Hampshire cricketers